Leo Chamodrakon or Chamaidrakon was a senior Byzantine palace official, holding the post of protovestiarios during the reign of Theophilos (r. 829–843). He is mentioned early in Theophilos' reign as participating in the proceedings against the murderers of Leo V the Armenian (r. 813–820), and again later, when he defended Manuel the Armenian from accusations of treason.

Sources

8th-century births
9th-century deaths
9th-century Byzantine people
Protovestiarioi